Željka Cvijanović (born 4 March 1967) is a Bosnian Serb politician serving as the 8th and current Serb member of the Presidency of Bosnia and Herzegovina, the collective federal head of state. She is also its current chairwoman, since 2022. She previously served as the 9th president of Republika Srpska from 2018 to 2022.

A member of the Alliance of Independent Social Democrats, Cvijanović was the 11th prime minister of Republika Srpska from 2013 to 2018. At the 2018 general election, she was elected president of Republika Srpska, assuming office on 19 November 2018. 

At the 2022 general election, Cvijanović was elected as the Serb member of the Presidency of Bosnia and Herzegovina, becoming the first female member of the Presidency since the end of the Bosnian War. She was sworn in as Presidency member on 16 November 2022.

Early life and education
Cvijanović was born Željka Grabovac in Teslić, present-day Bosnia and Herzegovina on 4 March 1967. Before going into full-time politics, she was an English teacher. Cvijanović studied at the Faculty of Philosophy at the University of Sarajevo, the Faculty of Philosophy in Banja Luka and the Faculty of Law in Banja Luka. She is a professor of English language and literature and also holds a master's degree in diplomatic and consular law from the Banja Luka Law School on "The International and legal status of the EU".

Career
Cvijanović worked as a teacher of English and as a senior interpreter and assistant for the European Union Monitoring Mission in Bosnia and Herzegovina. Then she was an advisor for European Integration and cooperation with international organizations to the prime minister of Republika Srpska Milorad Dodik; as Chief of Cabinet Affairs of the prime minister; and managed the Unit for coordination and European integration.

In the 2010–2014 parliamentary term, Cvijanović was an expert-external member of the Committee for European Integration and Regional Cooperation of the National Assembly of Republika Srpska. On 29 December 2010, she was appointed to the position of minister of economic affairs and regional Cooperation in the Government of Republika Srpska led by prime minister Aleksandar Džombić. On 12 March 2013, Cvijanović was appointed prime minister of Republika Srpska, succeeding Džombić. As the new prime minister, she became the first woman to serve in that office.

At the 2014 general election, Cvijanović stood as a candidate of the incumbent coalition SNSD-DNS-SP for the Serb member of the Presidency of Bosnia and Herzegovina. She lost against the opposition candidate Mladen Ivanić (PDP) by a narrow margin, and was later reappointed as prime minister of Republika Srpska in the entity's 15th cabinet.

At the 2018 general election, Cvijanović was elected president of Republika Srpska, assuming office on 19 November 2018. On 11 April 2022, she and Milorad Dodik, the Serb member of the Bosnian Presidency, were sanctioned by the United Kingdom for attempting to undermine the legitimacy of Bosnia and Herzegovina, with British Foreign Secretary Liz Truss stating that Dodik and Cvijanović "are deliberately undermining the hard-won peace in Bosnia and Herzegovina. Encouraged by Putin [Vladimir Putin], their reckless behavior threatens stability and security across the Western Balkans." On 15 November 2022, Cvijanović was succeeded by Dodik as president of Republika Srpska.

Presidency (2022–present)

2022 general election

On 1 July 2022, Cvijanović announced her candidacy in the Bosnian general election, running again for Bosnia and Herzegovina's three-person Presidency member, representing the Serbs.

At the general election, held on 2 October 2022, she was elected to the Presidency, having obtained 51.65% of the vote and thus becoming the first female member of the Presidency as established after the Bosnian War. The Serb Democratic Party candidate Mirko Šarović, was second with 35.45%.

Domestic policy
Cvijanović was sworn in as Presidency member on 16 November 2022, alongside newly elected member Denis Bećirović and re-elected member Željko Komšić.

Personal life
Željka is married to Aleksandar Cvijanović, and together they have two sons. She is of paternal Bosnian Serb and maternal Bosnian Croat descent.

On 2 April 2021, Cvijanović received her first dose of the COVID-19 vaccine, amid its pandemic in Bosnia and Herzegovina.

Orders

References

External links

Željka Cvijanović at imovinapoliticara.cin.ba

1967 births
Living people
People from Teslić
Prime ministers of Republika Srpska
Serbs of Bosnia and Herzegovina
Bosnia and Herzegovina people of Croatian descent 
Bosnia and Herzegovina people of Serbian descent
Bosnia and Herzegovina women in politics
Alliance of Independent Social Democrats politicians
Women prime ministers
Women presidents
21st-century women politicians
Members of the Presidency of Bosnia and Herzegovina
Chairmen of the Presidency of Bosnia and Herzegovina